Newhook is an English surname. Notable people with the surname include:

Alex Newhook (born 2001), Canadian ice hockey player
Cle Newhook (born 1943), Canadian Anglican priest
Frank Newhook (1918–1999), New Zealand botanist
Hazel Newhook (born 1914), Canadian politician
Jim Newhook (1915–1997), New Zealand veterinary academic

English-language surnames